Jan Philopon Dambrovský (1540 – 1586/1587), also known as Joannes Philopon Dambrowski, was a 16th-century Roman Catholic priest and dean of the Olomouc chapter, responsible for the poisoning of four archbishops.

Accusations 
At the end of 1585, Bishop Stanislav Pavlovský accused Dambrovský of poisoning several of his predecessors and some candidates for the episcopal see. While the church were investigating these claims, he was imprisoned at Hukvaldy Castle after he refused to proclaim his innocence. At one point, he unsuccessfully tried to escape.

The court documents themselves have either not been preserved or are kept in the Vatican Apostolic Archive, however, it is clear that Dambrovský confessed to poisoning four archbishops during interrogations, starting with Vilém Prusinovský z Víckova and ending with Janem Mezounem z Telče. On February 3, 1586, he was found guilty of the murders by an Olomouc ecclesiastical court and deprived of his priesthood, honors and benefits.

Stanislav Pavlovský apparently hesitated for a long time before deciding how to deal with the disgraced former priest, who used his time to write various defences. In the end, Pavlovský decided to hand him over for execution. On July 20, 1586, he sent two Jesuits to Hukvaldy to interrogate Dambrovský. The exact date of his execution is unknown, however, in the Olomouc Book of Půhon, a "Priest Philopon" is recorded.

See also
 List of serial killers by country

Bibliography 
 Jiří Fiala: Olomoucký pitaval, DANAL 1994,  (in Czech)
 Breitenbacher Antonín: Candidature of Cardinal Ondřej of Austria for the Olomouc Diocese, ČMM 32 (1908) 43–64. (in Czech)
 Breitenbacher Antonín: A Contribution to the History of the Reformation of the Moravian Clergy under Bishop Stanislav Pavlovsky. The Philipon Affair. ČMM 31 (1907) 152–176, 444–445. (in Czech)
 Švábenský Mojmír: Paleographic problem. Edition of the will of the Dean of Olomouc Jan Dambrowský, bishop, from 1581, biskupotravce, z r. 1581, in: 140 let SOAB, Praha 1979, 157–172. (in Czech)

1540 births
16th-century Bohemian Roman Catholic priests
16th-century criminals
Czech serial killers
Executed Roman Catholic priests
Executed serial killers
Male criminals
Male serial killers
People executed by decapitation
People executed by the Roman Empire
People from Zgierz County
Poisoners
Year of death unknown